

Founder

Charles Rait is the founder of Neonatal Network (1981) and the National Association of Neonatal Nurse (1984). He is the originator of the Academy of Neonatal Nursing (2001). He also has done hundreds or educational conferences and learning programs sponsored through these organizations.

History
The Academy of Neonatal Nursing (ANN) is a professional organization in the United States for neonatal nurses. It was established on February 6, 2001  and has approximately 6,000 members. The organization is supporter of the Foundation for Neonatal Research and Education (FNRE).

Mission
The mission of the Academy of Neonatal Nursing is to provide neonatal education and programs to health care professionals caring for neonatal and their families.

What the Academy of Neonatal Nursing Does
The mission is achieved through professional, peer-reviewed publications (Neonatal Network: The Journal of Neonatal Nursing), educational conferences, and offering books and other materials to neonatal health care professionals.

Executive committee
ANN is governed by an Executive Committee. Members of this committee are:
Debbie Fraser,
Julieanne Schiefelbein,
Denise L. Zimmerman, 
Tina Scott,
AnnMarie Barber, 
Karen D'Apolito,
Sean G. Smith,

Publications

ANN's primary publication is Neonatal Network: The Journal of Neonatal Nursing, published bimonthly. It has approximately 10,000 subscribers, including over 1,000 American neonatal intensive care units (NICUs). The peer-reviewed journal was established in 1981 and publishes articles on clinical practice, research and nursing education.

Continuing education
ANN is an accredited source for continuing education in nursing in the US. It runs three educational conferences per year: one for advanced-practice neonatal nurses, one for neonatal nurses in general, and one for mother-baby nurses. ANN also supports nursing research and education through the Foundation for Neonatal Research and Education.

See also
Neonatal Nursing Hall of Fame

References

External links
Official website

Nursing organizations in the United States
Medical and health organizations based in California
Neonatology
Hospital nursing